Zdenko Frťala (born 3 August 1970) is a Slovak football manager and former player.

As a player, Frťala played in the Czechoslovak First League for Trnava and in the Czech First League for Teplice. He made a total of 192 top-flight appearances and scored 6 goals.

Management career
After working mainly in assistant roles at clubs such as Blšany, Sparta Prague, Ružomberok and Teplice, Frťala was appointed manager of Czech 2. Liga side FK Varnsdorf in October 2011, replacing Aleš Křeček. Despite failing to win in his first six games, Varnsdorf celebrated their first win under Frťala against Třinec in the last match before the winter break of the 2011–12 Czech 2. Liga.

Honours

Player
 Spartak Trnava
 Czechoslovak Cup runner-up: 1990–91

 FK Teplice
 Czech First League runner-up: 1998–99

Manager
 FK Varnsdorf
 Czech National Football League runner-up: 2014–15

 FK Jablonec
 Czech Cup runner-up:  2015–16

 FC Hradec Králové
 Czech National Football League: 2020–21

References

External links

Manager profile at iDNES.cz 
Profile at Sparta Prague website 

1970 births
Living people
Sportspeople from Nitra
Czechoslovak footballers
Slovak footballers
FC Spartak Trnava players
Czech First League players
FK Teplice players
Slovak football managers
FK Čáslav managers
FK Varnsdorf managers
FK Železiarne Podbrezová managers
Slovak Super Liga managers
FK Jablonec managers
FC Hradec Králové managers
Slovak expatriate football managers
Expatriate football managers in the Czech Republic
Slovak expatriate sportspeople in the Czech Republic
Expatriate footballers in the Czech Republic
Slovak expatriate footballers
Association football defenders
ŠK Slovan Bratislava players
Czech National Football League managers
FK Teplice managers